The Humes Ranch cabin was built around the year 1900 by William Humes.  William Humes was originally from New York and arrived in the Elwha River area en route to the Klondike.  William, his brother, and a cousin liked the area so much they set up homestead sites.  In the early 1940s, Herb Crisler settled into the cabin at Humes Ranch with his bride, Lois, while they filmed wildlife for what became Walt Disney's "Olympic Elk" film.  Since acquiring the property from Peninsula Plywood, the National Park Service has restored the cabin, conforming to its original appearance and with much of the original materials. Wood deterioration, however, is occurring, as a result of the moist Olympic Peninsula environment.

The cabin is accessible via the Geyser Valley trail, approximately 3 miles from Whiskey Bend Trailhead and 1.3 miles from Goblins Gate. Just beyond the cabin lie Humes' old fields and then the trail continues for less than 0.5 miles to Dodger point bridge and the Grand Canyon of the Elwha.

References

Houses on the National Register of Historic Places in Washington (state)
Houses in Clallam County, Washington
National Register of Historic Places in Clallam County, Washington
National Register of Historic Places in Olympic National Park